Pulchrana melanomenta is a species of "true frog" in the family Ranidae. It is endemic to the Sulu Archipelago of the Philippines. It occurs in undisturbed and disturbed streams and rivers in lower montane and lowland forests. Breeding probably takes place in streams. It is potentially threatened by deforestation (logging) and by habitat conversion to agriculture, expanding human settlements, and nickel mining.

References

melanomenta
Amphibians of the Philippines
Endemic fauna of the Philippines
Fauna of Sulu
Fauna of Tawi-Tawi
Fauna of Basilan
Amphibians described in 1920
Taxa named by Edward Harrison Taylor